Fire Station No. 10 may refer to:
 Fire Station No. 10 (Birmingham, Alabama), listed on the National Register of Historic Places (NRHP)
Hose House No. 10, Evansville, Indiana, NRHP-listed
South Highlands Fire Station, Shreveport, Louisiana, NRHP-listed, also known as "Fire Station No. 10"
Pennsylvania National Fire Museum, Harrisburg, Pennsylvania, in the 1899 fire station building of Reily Hose Company No. 10
 Fire Station No. 10 (Tacoma, Washington), NRHP-listed

See also
List of fire stations